Snyder Grove is a ghost town in Woodbury County, in the U.S. state of Iowa.

History
A post office operated under the name Snyder's Grove from 1871 until 1872.

References

Geography of Woodbury County, Iowa